All Your Happy Life is the second studio album by English rock band The Wytches. It was released on 30 September 2016 via Heavenly Recordings. Recording sessions took place at Chapel Studios in South Thoresby, Lincolnshire and at Toe Rag Studios in Hackney, London. Production was handled by the Wytches, Luke Oldfield and Jim Sclavunos.

Critical reception

All Your Happy Life was met with generally favorable reviews from music critics. At Metacritic, which assigns a normalized rating out of 100 to reviews from mainstream publications, the album received an average score of 76 based on seven reviews. The aggregator AnyDecentMusic? has the critical consensus of the album at a 6.7 out of 10, based on nine reviews.

Emma Swann of DIY describes the album "gloomy, grey but definitely not dull" adding "The Wytches have cast another stellar spell". AllMusic's Timothy Monger called it "a challenging listen but there's plenty of craft here, making it an improvement upon their debut". Ryan Lunn of The Line of Best Fit wrote: "They never really embrace as much lyrical darkness as they did on their debut album, though, and they don't exactly reach for the occasional glimpse of light either. As a result, All Your Happy Life is a lightswitch that keeps awkwardly flickering, intentionally making the mise-en-scène as unsettling as possible".

In mixed reviews, Sammy Jones of Crack Magazine stated: "a leap forward for a band that's still dripping with potential". Joe Goggins of Loud and Quiet said: "They still haven't quite figured out how to channel the raw energy they conjure up so readily onstage into the sort of nervous tension that might suit their songwriting style better". Jake Kennedy of Record Collector said: "slower, heavier and maybe a little bit more messed up than before, while not stabbing at the same loud/quiet buttons, All Your Happy Life is a most welcome, if mildly unhinged continuation".

Track listing

Personnel
Kristian Bell – main artist, vocals, guitar, organ, percussion, songwriter, producer (tracks: 1-4, 6, 10), arranger (tracks: 2, 7)
Dan Ramsey – main artist, backing vocals, bass, songwriter, producer (tracks: 1-4, 6, 10), arranger (tracks: 2, 7)
Gianni Honey – main artist, drums, percussion, songwriter, producer (tracks: 1-4, 6, 10), arranger (tracks: 2, 7)
Mark Breed – organ & mellotron (tracks: 2, 6, 11), piano (track 10), additional songwriter
Jim Sclavunos – producer (tracks: 5, 7-9, 11), arranger (tracks: 2, 7), mixing (tracks: 8, 9)
Luke Oldfield – producer & recording (tracks: 1-4, 6, 10)
Mikey Young – mixing (tracks: 1-7, 10, 11), mastering
Tim Morris – recording (tracks: 5, 7-9, 11)
Guy Davie – additional mastering
Samuel Gull – artwork
Tim Hampson – layout

Charts

References

External links

2016 albums
Heavenly Recordings albums